Events from the year 2011 in Macau, China.

Incumbents
 Chief Executive - Fernando Chui
 President of the Legislative Assembly - Lau Cheok Va

Events

May
 15 May - The opening of Galaxy Macau in Cotai.

July
 4 July - The renaming of Taipei Economic and Cultural Center in Macau to Taipei Economic and Cultural Office in Macau.
 19 July - The official opening of Taipei Economic and Cultural Office in Macau in Sé.

References

 
Years of the 21st century in Macau
Macau
Macau
2010s in Macau